The Antwerp–Lage Zwaluwe railway (railway line 12 in the Belgian numbering plan) is an international railway line running from Antwerp in Belgium to Lage Zwaluwe in the Netherlands. The line was opened between 1854 and 1876. The opening of the high speed lines HSL 4 and HSL-Zuid in 2009 has decreased its importance for international passenger traffic. there is still a local international NMBS S32 train from Roosendaal to Puurs via Antwerp central  once an hour along with a few other Belgian domestic IC/ and a second hourly S32 but only as far as Essen station.

Stations
The main interchange stations on the Antwerp–Lage Zwaluwe railway are:

Antwerpen-Centraal railway station: to Brussels, Ghent, Herentals and Hasselt
Roosendaal: to Vlissingen and Breda
Lage Zwaluwe: to Dordrecht, Rotterdam and Breda

Railway lines in Belgium
Railway lines in the Netherlands
Railway lines in North Brabant
Transport in Moerdijk
Transport in Roosendaal
Railway lines opened in 1854